Evil Never Dies is the debut studio album of thrash metal band Toxic Holocaust. It was re-released in 2010 along with Hell on Earth to general critical approval.

Track listing

Personnel
Joel Grind - vocals, guitar, bass, drums

References

2003 debut albums
Toxic Holocaust albums